The Verve Pipe is an American rock band from Michigan. It was formed in 1992 in East Lansing by Brian Vander Ark, Brian Stout and Donny Brown.

History
In November 1992, Brian Vander Ark of the band "Johnny with an Eye" signed a production deal with producer/engineer Thomas Jansen, owner of Station C Studios Inc. After Jansen produced, recorded and mixed all "Johnny with an Eye" tracks, Jansen was looking for a little more from the band. During this same period of time Jansen was courting Don Brown's "Water for the Pool" band to come over and record the rest of their album at Station C Studios. Frazer was then given the job of engineering the rest of their album project. In a conversation with Vander Ark, Jansen advised Vander Ark to call Brown to join the band with one guitar member of "Water for the Pool". Frazer then engineered Brown's drums and vocals, and Stout's guitars and vocals, on "Johnny with an Eye" songs, and Vander Arks's guitar and vocals on "Water for the Pool" songs. Frazer mixed the new band released their first album, I've Suffered a Head Injury. The original 10-song version of the CD is no longer available. A seven-song version, without the original recording of "The Freshmen", was later released as an EP. The band, known for its energetic live performances, built strong followings during its early years, especially in the college towns of Kalamazoo and East Lansing.

In the fall of 1993, the band released a second album, Pop Smear, again working with Jansen for pre-production and basic tracks and Frazer with overdubs and mixing, which helped them gain a devoted following in their native state of Michigan and their eventual signing with RCA Records in 1995. A.J. Dunning replaced Stout on guitar for the recording of Pop Smear and remained in the band for their three RCA records. This album featured the popular tracks "Spoonful of Sugar" and "Victoria".

Their first major label release was 1996's Villains, which was a minor hit and launched two respectably selling singles, the first being "Photograph" which charted at #53 on the Billboard Airplay charts, then the No. 5 Billboard Hot 100 hit "The Freshmen", which was their most popular single. On June 28, 1997, the band performed at Edgefest in Barrie, Canada. While performing, someone in the crowd threw a beer bottle towards the stage and it hit Brian Vander Ark in the cheek. The band then left the stage to seek medical attention.

The band came back with a new album, The Verve Pipe, in 1999. The album, however, failed to achieve the commercial appeal of its predecessor. The band's 2001 release Underneath contained the song "Colorful", which was featured on the soundtrack of the film Rock Star, and "Happiness Is", featured on the soundtrack of the film Joe Somebody.

On September 15, 2009, Brian Vander Ark announced on his website that the band would be releasing a new album called A Family Album in October 2009. The band had been approached to contribute a song for a compilation album called Calling All Kids, which led to them creating an "entire album of family[-]friendly songs". It was also noted in the announcement that a new album of rock material would follow the family album. Immediately after the release of the family album, the band undertook a series of small-venue performances, mostly around Michigan and the East Coast.

On December 31, 2013, Drummer Donny Brown left the band.

On Feb 1, 2014, Channing Lee joined The Verve Pipe as a backup singer and songwriting collaborator.

On March 28, 2014, the band announced on their Facebook page that their first studio album since 2001, titled Overboard, would be released on June 17, 2014, and would be followed with a tour. The first single from the album, titled "Crash Landing", was released on April 1, 2014.

On February 17, 2017, the band released the full length album Parachute.

On August 1, 2021, founding member Brad Vander Ark rejoined the band.

On November 5, 2021, the band released its 9th full length album, Threads, with Channing Lee and Brian Vander Ark collaborating on all 12 tracks.

Discography

Studio albums
Pop Smear (1993)
Villains (1996) No. 24 US (RIAA: Platinum)
The Verve Pipe (1999) No. 158 US
Underneath (2001)
Overboard (2014)
Parachute (2017)
Threads (2021)

Family albums
A Family Album (2009)
Are We There Yet? (2013)

EPs
I've Suffered a Head Injury (1992)
A Homemade Holiday (2007)

Compilation albums
Platinum & Gold Collection (2004)
Super Hits (2007)
Villains - Live & Acoustic (2017)

Singles

See also
 List of alternative rock artists
 List of artists who reached number one on the U.S. alternative rock chart
 List of post-grunge bands
 List of RCA Records artists

References

External links

Brian Vander Ark's official website
The Verve Pipe collection at the Internet Archive's live music archive

 
1992 establishments in Michigan
Alternative rock groups from Michigan
American post-grunge musical groups
East Lansing, Michigan
Musical groups established in 1992
RCA Records artists
Articles which contain graphical timelines
Musical groups from Michigan
Musical groups from Grand Rapids, Michigan